Mario Banožić (born 10 March 1979) is a Croatian politician serving as Minister of Defence since 2020. He previously served as Minister of State Property from 2019 until 2020.

See also
Cabinet of Andrej Plenković I
Cabinet of Andrej Plenković II

References

Living people
1979 births
People from Vinkovci
21st-century Croatian politicians
Defence ministers of Croatia
University of Zagreb alumni
Croatian Democratic Union politicians